UNOSAT was a Brazilian scientific applications nanosatellite, designed, developed, built and tested by researchers and students working at the Northern Paraná University.

Features 
The primary objective of UNOSAT was to transmit voice messages and a telemetry data packet in AX25 protocol.

The UNOSAT scientific satellite had the following characteristics:

General 
 Format: parallelepiped with 46 cm x 25 cm x 8.5 cm
 Mass: 
 Orbit: heliosynchronous
 Stabilization: by rotation at 120 rpm
 Precision: 1 degree
 Altitude:

Payload 
The instrumentation shipped in UNOSAT was basically composed of: data collectors and transmitters.

The following data would be transmitted to earth:

 Voice message identifying the satellite
 Telemetry
 Temperature of solar panels
 Rechargeable battery temperatures
 Temperature of the transmitter and the on-board computer
 Battery voltage
 Centripetal acceleration

Mission 
As UNOSAT was planned to be launched as a secondary payload along with the SATEC satellite and it would be impossible for the launcher to put them into distinct orbits, both satellites were mechanically connected, although there was electrical and telemetry autonomy between the two. That satellite was lost in the explosion of the VLS-1 V03 launch vehicle on August 23, 2003 in an explosion three days before the launch date. This event came to be known as accident of Alcantara.

References

External links 
 Lançamento do foguete em Alcântara VLS Unosat – UNOPAR 
 UNOSAT 1 Gunter's Space Page

Satellites of Brazil
2003 in spaceflight